Pojuschie Gitary (The Singing Guitars) were the Soviet Union's first rock band to reach a phenomenal rate of success and popularity in the Soviet Union, Eastern Europe and in other countries. For that reason, they are often nicknamed "the Soviet Beatles" in a manner not that different from Hungary's Illés and Poland's Czerwone Gitary, whose name means "Red Guitars".

Drummer Arkadiy Aladyin died in March 2019.

References

External links
The bands Discography on russiandvd.com
Information on the Pojuschie Gitary (in russian)
Discography of the band (in russian)

Russian rock music groups
Soviet vocal-instrumental ensembles
Musical groups established in 1966
Soviet rock music groups